There were five tennis events at the 2014 South American Games. The events were held over 10–16 March.

Medalists 

Medal table

External links 
 Official website

 
2014 South American Games events
South American Games
2014